Gwendolyn Wallace Gooditis is an American real estate agent, educator, and politician, known as Wendy Gooditis. A Democrat, Gooditis was elected in November 2017 to represent Virginia's 10th House of Delegates district in the Virginia House of Delegates. The 10th district consists of portions of Loudoun, Clarke and Frederick counties.

Gooditis lost her brother to mental illness in 2017, shortly after announcing her House of Delegates campaign. Gooditis has said that this experience strengthened her determination to pass legislation focused on expanding Medicaid, suicide prevention, and combatting child abuse.

Gooditis is vice chair of the Agriculture, Chesapeake and Natural Resources Committee. She also serves on the Labor & Commerce and Counties, Cities, and Towns committees.

Early life and education
Gooditis grew up in Cranbury, New Jersey; she lived in Virginia for 25 years before running for office. Formerly a contractor for Bell Laboratories, Gooditis became a teacher in the 2000s, teaching in the Clarke County, Virginia public schools and at a private school. Gooditis then became a real estate agent.

Prior to moving to Virginia, Gooditis was shortlisted for the U.S. Olympic equestrian team as a 3-day eventer.

Political career
Gooditis's successful 2017 run for the 10th district seat in the Virginia House of Delegates was her first run for elected office. She defeated incumbent Republican Randy Minchew, who had held the seat since 2011.

Bills introduced
In 2018, Gooditis introduced House Bill 569, which requires the state to issue an annual report to lawmakers about its progress and activities on suicide prevention. The bill passed with broad bipartisan support and was signed into law in March 2018.

In 2019, Gooditis introduced four bills to combat child abuse. Those bills would change Virginia's definition of child sexual abuse, maintain records of child abuse investigations for three years, make clergy of all religious denominations mandated reporters of child abuse, and penalize those who expose children to domestic violence.

In 2019, Gooditis served as Chief Co-patron of a red flag bill that would allow courts to temporarily remove guns from people who pose an immediate risk to themselves or others.

Medicaid
Gooditis voted to pass Medicaid expansion in the Virginia General Assembly in March 2018, expanding health care access to 400,000 Virginians.

Electoral history

Awards and recognition
In August 2019, Gooditis was given the 2019 HosPAC Healthcare Hero award for her efforts in passing Medicaid expansion in Virginia, helping more than 400,000 Virginians qualify for coverage.

Personal life
Gooditis lives in Boyce, Virginia. She has two children with her husband, Christopher.

See also
 Virginia House of Delegates elections, 2017
 Virginia House of Delegates elections, 2019

References

External links
Official website

1960 births
Living people
21st-century American politicians
21st-century American women politicians
Democratic Party members of the Virginia House of Delegates
People from Boyce, Virginia
People from Cranbury, New Jersey
Rutgers University alumni
Shenandoah University alumni
Women state legislators in Virginia
21st-century American educators
21st-century American women educators